Apiopetalum is a genus of plant  in the family Apiaceae, comprising 2 species. They are small trees, reaching 6 m in height, and have simple leaves. The genus is endemic to New Caledonia. Its closest relative is the Australian Actinotus.

References

Apiaceae genera
Mackinlayoideae
Flora of New Caledonia
Taxa named by Henri Ernest Baillon